The Honda Sports Award for basketball is presented annually to the best women's college basketball player, as selected by a panel of more than 1,000 NCAA administrators. The award was first presented following the 1976–77 season. Four nominees are chosen annually by a panel of coaches representing the Women's Basketball Coaches Association (WBCA), and the winner is chosen by the votes of administrators from every NCAA member institution, with each institution having one vote.

Winners 

Thirty-one women's college basketball players have received the Honda Sports Award for basketball in the 41 seasons it has been presented. Nine players have won the award multiple times. Breanna Stewart of UConn is the only three-time winner; eight others have won the award twice: Nancy Lieberman of Old Dominion, Cheryl Miller of USC, Dawn Staley of Virginia, Chamique Holdsclaw of Tennessee, Diana Taurasi of UConn, Seimone Augustus of LSU, Candace Parker of Tennessee, and Maya Moore of UConn.

Totals by school

The following is a list of all schools with players having received the Honda Sports Award in basketball, the total number of awards per school, the number of individual players awarded per school, and the years in which the awards were received.

See also

 List of sports awards honoring women

Notes

College basketball player of the year awards in the United States
College basketball trophies and awards in the United States
College women's basketball in the United States
Sports awards honoring women
Awards established in 1977
1977 establishments in the United States
College sports trophies and awards in the United States